Protea lanceolata is a species of plant in the family Proteaceae. It is endemic to the Cape Provinces of South Africa.  It is threatened by habitat loss.

References

External links

lanceolata
Flora of the Cape Provinces
Endemic flora of South Africa
Vulnerable plants
Taxonomy articles created by Polbot